Joseph Haydn is not primarily remembered as a composer of opera, yet he wrote 17 of them, and the genre occupied a great deal of his time. During the 1770s and 1780s, Haydn ran an opera troupe on behalf of his employer, Prince Nikolaus Esterházy, which put on up to 150 performances per year. A number of the operas were Haydn's own work. Haydn's operas are only occasionally performed today.

The list is arranged chronologically and divided by career stage.

Composed as a freelance musician

1753: Der krumme Teufel, Hob. 29/1a, Singspiel (libretto by Joseph von Kurz), composed during Haydn's time as a freelance musician. Now lost.

Composed during Haydn's service for the Esterházy family

Composed for the first London journey

1791: L'anima del filosofo, ossia Orfeo ed Euridice, Hob. 28/13, dramma per musica in 4 acts (libretto by Carlo Francesco Badini). Haydn's own version of the Orpheus tale, the plot of a great many operas. Haydn's only post-Esterházy opera, composed for his 1791 trip to London but never performed there, due to intrigues.

Recordings

During the 1970s, after the release of his complete Haydn symphony cycle, Hungarian-American conductor Antal Doráti recorded eight of Haydn's operas for Philips Records, with the Orchestre de Chambre de Lausanne. The selected works were Armida, La fedeltà premiata, L'incontro improvviso, L'infedeltà delusa, L'isola disabitata, Il mondo della luna, Orlando paladino and La vera costanza. These were initially released on LP format, then subsequently on CD in 1993. Many of Doráti's Haydn operas are still reference recordings, and have had successful reviews from Gramophone and The Penguin Guide to Recorded Classical Music.

References

Sources
The dates given above are from the Grove Dictionary of Music and Musicians, as compiled by Georg Feder.
Branscombe, Peter (1992), "Haydn, Joseph" in The New Grove Dictionary of Opera, ed. Stanley Sadie (London) 

 
Operas
Haydn